Clara Santucci is an American long-distance runner.

NCAA
Clara Grandt Santucci is a multiple time NCAA Division I All-American at West Virginia Mountaineers track and field.

Professional
Santucci finished 6th at the 2014 Chicago Marathon.

She competed at the 2014 IAAF World Half Marathon Championships.

Santucci also won the 2014 and 2015 Pittsburgh Marathon.

References

External links
 

1987 births
Living people
American female long-distance runners
People from West Union, West Virginia
Track and field athletes from Chicago
21st-century American women